Melissa Myerscough (pronounced Myers/co), née Price (born September 5, 1979) is an American former hammer thrower.

She finished twelfth at the 2001 World Championships. At the 2003 American championships she tested positive for the banned substance tetrahydrogestrinone (THG), and was disqualified from the gold medal. She was suspended by the IAAF from April 2004 to April 2006.

Her personal best throw was 67.59 metres, achieved in May 2003 in Lincoln, Nebraska.

She is married to Carl Myerscough, who also has been found guilty of doping.

Achievements

See also
 List of sportspeople sanctioned for doping offences

References

External links
 

1979 births
Living people
American female hammer throwers
Doping cases in athletics
American sportspeople in doping cases